Michaela Blyde (born 29 December 1995) is a New Zealand professional rugby sevens player and Olympic gold medalist. 
She was the first female player to win back-to-back World Rugby Sevens Player of the Year titles in 2017 and 2018. She was a member of the New Zealand Sevens team  which won a gold medal side at the 2020 Tokyo Olympic Games.

Early life
Blyde was born on 29 December 1995 in New Plymouth to Cherry (nee Sutton) and Stephen Blyde. Her father, Stephen, played halfback for local club Clifton and provincial rugby for the Taranaki Colts while her mother Cherry played representative rugby for Taranaki, played for the Black Ferns in 1992 and in 2022  became the first female president of the Taranaki rugby football union. Both parents also represented New Zealand at touch rugby.

Blyde was raised up on the family’s dairy family at Lepperton, near New Plymouth in Taranaki, alongside her older brother Christopher and younger twin brothers Cole and  Liam.  Blyde's secondary education was undertaken at New Plymouth Girls High School.

Rugby career 
When she was young her parents encouraged her and her brothers to play for their local rugby club, Clifton. "Rugby was my first sport as a five-year-old, but when I got to the age where we had to start tackling, I was a bit scared of playing with the boys" and so she switched at the age of eight to playing football. She began playing it again in year 12 at high school, though football was her first priority.

In 2012 the New Zealand Rugby Union organized a “Go for Gold” campaign to identify talent with the potential to represent New Zealand in the Sevens competition at the Rio Olympics. Cherie Blyde who was employed at the time by Taranaki Rugby as a Rugby Development Officer made her daughter who had just recommenced playing rugby, attend one of the open trials.

At the trial she was put through various fitness, rugby skill and character assessment activities. Blyde was heavily involved in playing football at the time and was upset when attendance at a second trial meant missing out on a football tournament. Of the 800 who attended a trial, Blyde along with Gayle Broughton and Lauren Bayens from Taranaki were among the 30 deemed promising who attended a training camp at Waiouru in mid-2012.

Debut for the Black Fern Sevens
Blyde’s superior speed, meant that at 17 years of age and still at high school she debuted for the  New Zealand Sevens at the 2013 Oceania Women's Sevens Championship in Noosa, Australia in October 2013.  As she commenced her warmed-up for her first game she noticed her father on the sidelines. He had without telling her flown over from New Zealand to surprise her, which caused her to break down and begin crying before she ran to give him a hug. Blyde found it daunting playing alongside and against experienced players at a national and international level.
Alongside representing New Zealand Blyde played for her school in the 2013 Condor Sevens, which was the first time New Plymouth Girls’ High had fielded a team in this National Secondary Schools Rugby Sevens competition. Competing against 16 other teams New Plymouth made it to the final, only to lose to Hamilton Girls. Blyde was named Player of the Tournament and was also selected for the tournament team. Outside of school she also played in regional competitions and for Taranaki in national competitions in 2013. Blyde played for the Taranaki team in the National Sevens competition in January 2014 where they came fifth.

Immediately upon leaving school Blyde was offered a national training contract for 2014, and in February of that year, she took part in her first Rugby World Sevens Series tournament.

Rio Olympic Games
Along with Shiray Tane she was one of the two traveling reserves for the Rio Games, which required them to stay in accommodation outside of the Olympic village away from the rest of the team. Following the disappointment of not making the playing side Blyde made significant changes to improve her performance.
After commencing the 2016-2017 Women’s World Sevens Series with only a one year contact Blyde was to end the season with 40 points and the title of the series’ top try-scorer, which assisted New Zealand in winning the series title. Her performance led to Blyde being named 2017 World Rugby Women’s Sevens Player of the year.

Over the course of the 2017-2018 Women’s World Sevens Series Blyde scored 27 tries and was named World Rugby Women’s Sevens Player of the year in 2018, becoming the first women’s player to win it not only twice, but in consecutive years.

In 2018, she won gold medals at both the Commonwealth Games and the Rugby World Cup Sevens. She also won a gold medal at the Tokyo Olympics in 2021. At Tokyo Blyde scored seven tries in five matches, including in the final.

2022 Commonwealth Games
Blyde was named in the Black Ferns Sevens squad for the 2022 Commonwealth Games in Birmingham. She won a bronze medal at the Commonwealth Games.

She later won a silver medal at the Rugby World Cup Sevens in Cape Town.

Awards and honours 
 2017, Canada Sevens Langford dream team.
 2017, World Rugby Women's Sevens Player of the Year.
 2018, World Rugby Women's Sevens Player of the Year.
 2018, Taranaki Sports Awards Sportswoman of the Year and Overall Sportsperson of the Year.
 2019, Australian Women's Sevens performance tracker player of the round.
 2021, Joint winner of Taranaki Daily News Person of the Year 2021 with Gayle Broughton.

Personal life 
After graduating she studied for a Certificate in Animal Care at Otago Polytechnic in Dunedin.  In 2014 she commenced a Bachelor of Sport and Exercise through correspondence at Massey University.
Her younger brothers,  Liam and Cole were academy rugby players with Taranaki, Liam went on to be selected for a development project for the men's Sevens team before playing for the Taranaki Bulls in 2021.

References

External links
 
 Black Ferns profile

1995 births
Living people
New Zealand female rugby sevens players
New Zealand women's international rugby sevens players
Rugby sevens players at the 2018 Commonwealth Games
Commonwealth Games rugby sevens players of New Zealand
Commonwealth Games gold medallists for New Zealand
Commonwealth Games medallists in rugby sevens
World Rugby Awards winners
Olympic rugby sevens players of New Zealand
Rugby sevens players at the 2020 Summer Olympics
Medalists at the 2020 Summer Olympics
Olympic gold medalists for New Zealand
Olympic medalists in rugby sevens
20th-century New Zealand women
21st-century New Zealand women
Rugby sevens players at the 2022 Commonwealth Games
Medallists at the 2018 Commonwealth Games
Medallists at the 2022 Commonwealth Games